Charles Burke may refer to:

Charles H. Burke (1861–1944), American politician
Charles Burke (British Army officer) (1882–1917)
Charlie Burke, former head coach of the Hong Kong National Men and Women's cricket teams
Chuck Burke (born 1930), American Olympic speed skater

See also
Charles Burke Elbrick (1908–1983), American ambassador